Erythropodium  is a genus of soft coral in the family Anthothelidae.

Species 
The following species are recognized:

 Erythropodium astreoide Studer, 1890
 Erythropodium caribaeorum (Duchassaing & Michelotti, 1860)
 Erythropodium hicksoni (Utinomi, 1972)
 Erythropodium indica (Thomson & Henderson, 1905)
 Erythropodium salomonense Thomson & Mackinnon, 1910

References 

Anthozoa genera
Anthothelidae